Lai Kuan-hua (born 23 July 1981) is a Taiwanese former road cyclist, who was a professional from 2002 until 2010 with the .

Major results 
 2004
 5th Tour de Okinawa
 2005
 7th Overall Tour of East Java
 2006
 5th Overall Tour of Thailand
 2007
 1st Stage 7 Jelajah Malaysia
 2008
 10th Overall Tour of East Java
 2009
 9th Overall Tour de Taiwan

References

External links 
 

1981 births
Living people
Taiwanese male cyclists
People from Changhua County